Biter or Biters may refer to:

Art, entertainment, and media
 Biter, the sword Orcrist from J. R. R. Tolkien's Middle-earth
 Biters (band)
 Biters, a fictional indigenous fauna in the game Factorio

People
 Aytaç Biter Turkish racing car driver

Vessels
 HMS Biter, the name of several ships of the British Royal Navy, including:
 HMS Biter (D97)
 HMS Biter (P270)